Émile Molinier (26 April 18575 May 1906) was a 19th-century French curator and art historian.

Career 
Following his elder brother Auguste, Émile Molinier studied at the École Nationale des Chartes. He wrote a thesis on medieval history entitled Étude sur la vie d'Ernoul, sire d'Audrehem, maréchal de France which earned him the archivist paleographer degree in 1879.

He first worked at the  before joining the Louvre, where he served as curator of the newly created art objects department. He published books on stained glass, ceramics, enamels and furniture and organized major exhibitions, including the Exposition Rétrospective held at the Petit Palais in 1900. A specialist of French decorative art, he wrote the first catalog of the Wallace Collection at the time of its opening.

Selected works 
1882: Chronique normande du XIVe siècle, (editor, with Auguste Molinier)
1882: Catalogue de la collection Timbal, (in collab.)
1883: Étude sur la vie d'Arnoul d'Audrehem, maréchal de France, 1302-1370
1883: Les Majoliques italiennes en Italie
1884: Les Della Robbia, leur vie et leur œuvre, d'après des documents inédits, suivi d'un catalogue de l'œuvre des Della Robbia en Italie et dans les principaux musées de l'Europe, (in collab.)
1885: Dictionnaire des émailleurs, depuis le moyen âge jusqu'à la fin du XVIII,
1886: Le Château de Fontainebleau au XVIIe siècle, d'après des documents inédits, (in collaboration with Eugène Müntz)
1888: La Céramique italienne au XVe siècle,
1888: Le Trésor de la basilique de Saint-Marc à Venise,
1889: Venise, ses arts décoratifs, ses musées et ses collections
1891: L'Émaillerie, Hachette, series ""
1894: Benvenuto Cellini
1896: Catalogue des ivoires
1897: Histoire générale des arts appliqués à l'industrie du Ve à la fin du XVIIIe siècle, (codir. Et collab.)
1902: Le mobilier français du XVIIe et du XVIIIe
1890-1891 ''L'Art. Revue bi-mensuelle illustrée (Director and chief editor)

References

External links 
 Notice on Emile Molinier on INHA

École Nationale des Chartes alumni
French librarians
French art historians
1857 births
1906 deaths
Writers from Nantes